This list of theatre awards is an index to articles about notable awards granted for theatre productions and performances. It is organized by country and region. Typically awards are only given for local productions.

North America
 Pulitzer Prize for Drama
Cappies
 Touring Broadway Awards

New York City, USA 
 Tony Award (including the Regional Theatre Tony Award) (US)
 Chita Rivera Awards for Dance and Choreography (New York City, US)
 Clarence Derwent Awards (New York City, US)
 Del Hughes Lifetime Achievement Award for Excellence in the Art of Stage Management (given in New York City, US)
 Donaldson Awards (New York City, US)
 Drama Desk Award (New York City, US)
 Drama League Award (New York City, US)
 Lucille Lortel Awards (New York City, US)
 New York Drama Critics' Circle Awards (New York City, US)
 New York Innovative Theatre Awards (New York City, US)
 Obie Award (New York City, US)
 Outer Critics Circle Award (New York City, US)
 Susan Smith Blackburn Prize (New York City, Houston, TX, and London, UK)
 Theatre World Award (New York City, US)
 United Solo Award (New York City, US)

Other USA 
 ariZoni Theatre Awards of Excellence (Phoenix Metropolitan Area, US)
 Back Stage Garland Awards (Los Angeles, US) (defunct)
 Barrymore Awards for Excellence in Theater (Philadelphia, US)
 Big Easy Awards for Excellence in Music, Theater and Classical Arts (New Orleans, US)
 Carbonell Awards (South Florida, US)
 Drama-Logue Award (West Coast, US) (defunct)
 Drammy Awards (Portland, OR)
 Elliot Norton Awards (Boston, US)
 Helen Hayes Award (Washington, D.C., US)
 Henry Awards (Colorado Theatre Guild, Denver, Colorado, US)
 Ivey Awards (Minneapolis–Saint Paul, US) (defunct)
 Joseph Jefferson Award (Chicago, US)
 LA Weekly Theater Award (Los Angeles, US) (defunct)
 Los Angeles Drama Critics Circle Award (Los Angeles, US)
 NAACP Theatre Awards (US)
 National High School Musical Theatre Awards (US)
 Ovation Awards (Los Angeles, US)
 Sarah Siddons Award (for female actresses in Chicago theatre)
 The Suzi Bass Awards, (Atlanta, US)

Canada 
 Dora Award (Toronto, Ontario)
 Elizabeth Sterling Haynes Award (Edmonton, Alberta)
 Jessie Richardson Theatre Awards (Vancouver, British Columbia)
  (Quebec, Canada)
 Montreal English Theatre Awards - METAs (Montreal, Quebec)
 Rideau Awards (Ottawa, Ontario)
 Robert Merritt Awards (Halifax, Nova Scotia)
 Siminovitch Prize in Theatre (Canada)

Mexico 
 Premios Metropolitanos de Teatro (Mexico City)

Europe

London, UK 
 Laurence Olivier Awards (United Kingdom)
 London Critics' Circle Theatre Awards (United Kingdom)
 National Dance Awards (United Kingdom)
 Clarence Derwent Awards  (United Kingdom)
 Evening Standard Theatre Awards (United Kingdom)
 The Stage Theatre Awards (United Kingdom)
 Technical Theatre Awards (London, UK)
WhatsOnStage Awards

Other UK 
 Theatre Awards UK
 Total Theatre Awards (Edinburgh, Scotland)
 Critics' Awards for Theatre in Scotland (Scotland)
 Manchester Evening News Annual Drama Awards (United Kingdom)

France 
 Masque d’Or, (France)
 Molière Award (France)

Italy 
 Premio Ubu
 Le Maschere Awards
 Flaiano Prizes

Greece 
 Karolos Koun Theatre Awards
 Dimitris Horn Award, for best young actor
 Melina Mercouri Award, for best young actress

Iceland 
 Gríman - The Icelandic Theatre Awards

Norway 
 Hedda Award
 The International Ibsen Award (Oslo, Norway)
 Leonard Statuette

Poland 
 Witkacy Prize - Critics' Circle Award, for outstanding achievements in the promotion of Polish theatre throughout the world (Polish Centre of ITI)
 Tadeusz Boy-Żeleński Award, for achievements in theatre (Polish Centre of AICT/IATC)
 Konrad Swinarski Award, for best director (awarded by "Theatre" magazine)
 Aleksander Zelwerowicz Award, for best actress or actor (awarded by "Theatre" magazine)

Turkey 
 Bedia Muvahhit Theatre Awards (http://www.bediaodulleri.com/index.html) (İzmir, Turkey)
 Afife Jale Theatre Awards

Other Europe 
 Golden Globes (Portugal)
 Dosky Awards (Slovakia)
 Eugene O'Neill Award (Sweden)
 Europe Theatre Prize (Europe)
 Golden Mask Award (Russia)
 Croatian Theatre Awards (Croatia)
 Hans-Reinhart-Ring (Switzerland)
 Hedda Award (Norway)
 Irish Times Theatre Awards (Irish Republic and Northern Ireland)
  (Netherlands)
 The Statuette of Joakim Vujić (Kragujevac, Serbia)
 Ikar Awards (Bulgaria)
 Tor Vergata Award (Italy)
 Lithuanian stage golden cross (Lithuania)

Oceania

Australia 
 Helpmann Awards (Australia)
 Green Room Awards (Melbourne, Australia)
 Matilda Awards (Brisbane, Australia)
 Sydney Theatre Awards (Sydney, Australia)

New Zealand 
 Chapman Tripp Theatre Awards (Wellington)
 Ngā Whakarākei O Whātaitai / Wellington Theatre Awards (Wellington)
 Dunedin Theatre Awards (Dunedin)

Africa

South Africa 
 Fleur du Cap Theatre Awards (Cape Town)
 Naledi Theatre Awards (Gauteng)

Asia

India 
 Nataka Kalasarathy
 Sangeet Natak Academy Award (India)
 Yuwaraj of Theatre Awards, presented by Swatantra Theatre, India

References

External links